Bud Geary (February 15, 1898 – February 22, 1946), was an American film actor. He appeared in 258 films between years 1920 and 1946.

He was born in Salt Lake City, Utah and died in Hollywood, California, aged 48.

Partial filmography

Everyman's Price (1921)
 Robin Hood (1922)
 Why Women Remarry (1923)
 The Scarlet Honeymoon (1925)
 Soft Living (1928)
 The Flying Fleet (1929)
 Shipmates (1931)
 The Circus Queen Murder (1933)
 The Meanest Gal in Town (1934)
 The Spider's Web (1938)
 Mysterious Doctor Satan (1940)
 Secret Service in Darkest Africa (1943)
 Thundering Trails (1943)
 Sheriff of Sundown (1944)
 Tucson Raiders (1944)
 Marshal of Reno (1944)
 The San Antonio Kid (1944)
 Cheyenne Wildcat (1944)
 Vigilantes of Dodge City (1944)
 Sheriff of Las Vegas (1944)
 Great Stagecoach Robbery (1945)
 Lone Texas Ranger (1945)
 Phantom of the Plains (1945)
 Marshal of Laredo (1945)
 Colorado Pioneers (1945)
 Wagon Wheels Westward (1945)
 The Cherokee Flash (1945)
 The Purple Monster Strikes (1945)
 The Crimson Ghost (1946)
 California Gold Rush (1946)
 Sheriff of Redwood Valley (1946)
 Sun Valley Cyclone (1946)
 Conquest of Cheyenne (1946)
 Santa Fe Uprising (1946)

External links

1898 births
1946 deaths
Male actors from Utah
American male film actors
20th-century American male actors
American Latter Day Saints
Burials at Forest Lawn Memorial Park (Glendale)